WDMY-LD, virtual channel 23 (VHF digital channel 6), is a low-power television station licensed to Toledo, Ohio, United States. The station is owned by Milwaukee-based VCY America.

History
The station was founded on December 5, 1990 and originally broadcast as W64BM on analog channel 64. It changed its channel number to 38 and subsequently its call-sign to W38DH on August 11, 2005.

The station has seen a number of network affiliations in its 27-year history. First, it was an affiliate of Home Shopping Spree and The Box. By November 2000, it had switched to become an affiliate of MTV2. By 2006, it had reverted to America's Store. After America's Store folded on April 3, 2007, W38DH began broadcasting programming from the Home Shopping Network. On December 28, 2016, due to an impasse regarding the lease of their broadcasting tower, the station's analog signal went silent.

W38DH's analog signal covered most of the Toledo area quite adequately, which is not always seen regarding a low-power station.

On August 20, 2017, following a change of ownership to Marquee Broadcasting, the station changed its call letters to WVMY-LP. On November 27, 2017, Marquee moved the "WVMY" call-letters to its station in Parkersburg, West Virginia, renaming this station to WDMY-LP in the process.

WDMY-LP had been granted a construction permit to convert to digital on channel 23. However, after phase one of the FCC repack, channel 23 went to WNWO-TV. Subsequently, the station filed to move operations to VHF channel 6. WDMY-LP was licensed for digital operation on channel 6 effective November 12, 2021, simultaneously changing its call sign to WDMY-LD.

External links

DMY-LD
Television channels and stations established in 1992
1992 establishments in Ohio
VCY America stations
Low-power television stations in the United States